The 2019 Ireland Tri-Nation Series was a cricket tournament that was held from 5 to 17 May in Ireland. It was a tri-nation series featuring Bangladesh, Ireland and the West Indies, with all the matches played as One Day Internationals (ODIs). The ODI fixtures were part of Bangladesh and West Indies' preparation for the 2019 Cricket World Cup. Bangladesh also played a 50-over warm-up match against Ireland A on 5 May 2019.

The West Indies were the first team to qualify for the final, after they beat hosts Ireland in the fourth match of the series. Bangladesh also qualified for the final, after they beat the West Indies in the fifth match. Bangladesh won the series, after beating the West Indies by five wickets in a rain-affected final. It was the first time that Bangladesh had won a multi-team international tournament.

Squads

In late April 2019, Taskin Ahmed and Farhad Reza were added to Bangladesh's squad. Mark Adair was added to Ireland's squad, replacing Stuart Thompson, who was ruled out due to injury. After initially naming a squad for their first two ODIs, Ireland named an unchanged squad for the remaining fixtures.

Tour match

50-over match: Ireland A vs Bangladesh

Points table

Fixtures

1st ODI

2nd ODI

3rd ODI

4th ODI

5th ODI

6th ODI

Final

References

External links
 Series home at ESPN Cricinfo

2019 in Bangladeshi cricket
2019 in Irish cricket
2019 in West Indian cricket
International cricket competitions in 2019
Bangladeshi cricket tours of Ireland
West Indian cricket tours of Ireland
Tri-Nation Series
Ireland Tri-Nation Series